Sierra Leone sent a delegation of three athletes to compete at the 2008 Summer Olympics in Beijing, China.

Athletics

Men

Women

Key
Note–Ranks given for track events are within the athlete's heat only
Q = Qualified for the next round
q = Qualified for the next round as a fastest loser or, in field events, by position without achieving the qualifying target
NR = National record
N/A = Round not applicable for the event
Bye = Athlete not required to compete in round

Boxing

Saidu Kargbo, named as a late addition, fought in the light flyweight division.

References

Nations at the 2008 Summer Olympics
2008
Olympics